Omorgus mariettae is a species of hide beetle in the subfamily Omorginae.

References

mariettae
Beetles described in 1986